Jackie Amanda McWilliams (born 18 February 1964), also known as Jackie Burns, is a former women's field hockey player from Northern Ireland who represented both Ireland and Great Britain at international level. She represented Great Britain at the 1992 Summer Olympics, winning the bronze medal.

Domestic teams
McWilliams played club level field hockey for Randalstown and Ballymena. She was still playing for Ballymena in 2011 when in her late forties. McWilliams also represented Ulster at interprovincial level.

International

Ireland
McWilliams made 64 senior appearances for Ireland.

Great Britain
McWilliams made 34 senior appearances Great Britain. She represented Great Britain at the 1992 Summer Olympics, winning the bronze medal.

Later years
McWilliams worked as a schoolteacher at Ballymena Primary School. She also helped coach both the Ulster women's field hockey team  and Ballymena Academy. Two of McWilliams' nephews are senior men's field hockey internationals. Her sister, Anne, is the mother of Paul and Mark Gleghorne. Paul has played for Ireland while his brother, Mark has played for Ireland, England and Great Britain.

References

External links
 

1964 births
Living people
Olympic field hockey players of Great Britain
Field hockey players at the 1992 Summer Olympics
Ireland international women's field hockey players
Female field hockey players from Northern Ireland
Irish female field hockey players
British female field hockey players
Olympic bronze medallists for Great Britain
Olympic medalists in field hockey
Medalists at the 1992 Summer Olympics
Female field hockey defenders
Irish field hockey coaches
Schoolteachers from Northern Ireland
People from Ballymoney
Sportspeople from County Antrim